Planchonella is a genus of flowering trees in the gutta-percha family, Sapotaceae. Named in honour of Jules Émile Planchon, it contains around 100 mainly tropical species, two of which occur in South America and about 18 in Australasia. It was described by Jean Baptiste Louis Pierre. The genus is included in the larger genus Pouteria by some authorities, hence species such as Planchonella queenslandica are also known as Pouteria queenslandica.

Selected species

Planchonella australis  (R.Br.) Pierre
Planchonella contermina  Pierre ex Dubard
Planchonella costata  (Endl.) Pierre
Planchonella cotinifolia  (A.DC.) Dubard
Planchonella crenata  Munzinger & Swenson
Planchonella eerwah  (F.M.Bailey) P.Royen
Planchonella glauca  Swenson & Munzinger
Planchonella kaalaensis  Aubrév.
Planchonella latihila  Munzinger & Swenson
Planchonella luteocostata  Munzinger & Swenson
Planchonella mandjeliana  Munzinger & Swenson
Planchonella myrsinoides  (A.Cunn. ex Benth.) S.T.Blake ex Francis
Planchonella pinifolia (Baill.) Dubard
Planchonella povilana  Swenson & Munzinger
Planchonella roseoloba  Munzinger & Swenson
Planchonella rufocostata  Munzinger & Swenson

References

 
Sapotaceae genera